"Cardigan" (stylized in all lowercase) is a song recorded by American singer-songwriter Taylor Swift. It was released as the lead single of her eighth studio album, Folklore (2020), on July 27, 2020, via Republic Records. Written by Swift and its producer Aaron Dessner, "Cardigan" is a slow-burning, folk, soft rock, and indie rock ballad, with a stripped-down arrangement of a tender piano, clopping drums, and melancholic violins.

The song's lyrics discuss a comforting romance lost in memories, from the perspective of a female narrator named Betty, one of the several fictitious characters narrated in Folklore. An accompanying music video for the song, written, directed, and styled by Swift, was released alongside the album launch. The video has been described as following a dreamy, cottagecore aesthetic, featuring Swift in three different settings: a "cozy cabin" in the woods, a moss-covered forest, and a dark stormy sea, which represents the concept of the different phases in relationships. Upon its release, "Cardigan" received widespread acclaim from music critics for its poetic songwriting and laid-back sound. It received nominations for Song of the Year and Best Pop Solo Performance at the 63rd Annual Grammy Awards. An acoustic version of the song, branded "Cabin in Candlelight", was also released.

Commercially, "Cardigan" debuted atop the global Spotify songs chart with over 7.742 million streams, which was, at that time, the biggest opening day for a song on the platform in 2020. With the song's debut at the number-one spot of the Billboard Hot 100 as well, Swift scored the sixth U.S. number-one single of her career. Along with Folklore debut atop the Billboard 200 the same week, she became the first artist ever to simultaneously debut atop the Hot 100 and Billboard 200. "Cardigan" further topped the Hot Alternative Songs, Hot Rock & Alternative Songs, Streaming Songs and Digital Song Sales charts, making Swift the first act in history to garner twenty chart-toppers on the latter. It reached number one in Australia, the top ten in Canada, Ireland, Malaysia, New Zealand, Singapore, and the United Kingdom, and the top 20 in Denmark, Estonia, Lithuania and Scotland.

Development and composition 
"Cardigan" was written by Taylor Swift and Aaron Dessner, and was produced by Dessner. The song is a wistful, slow-burning, folk, soft rock and indie rock song driven by a stripped-down arrangement of a tender piano and a clopping drum sample, over a moody atmosphere. It is written in the key of E♭ major and has a moderately fast tempo of 130 beats per minute. Swift's vocal range in the song spans from E3 to A4. The lyrics display confidence, but are also "slightly embittered". Swift told her fans that "Cardigan" is about "a lost romance and why young love is often fixed so permanently within our memories". It is one of the three of the tracks on the album that depict the same love triangle from three different perspectives at different times in their lives, the other two being "August" and "Betty".

In the song, Swift sings from the perspective of a fictional character named Betty, who recalls the separation and enduring optimism of a relationship with someone named James. While promoting the limited edition version of the single, Swift told fans that she sent the original songwriting voice memo to Aaron Dessner on April 27, 2020, after hearing the instrumental tracks he created. Dessner said "Cardigan" was the first song written in their collaboration, and was the first song written from the album altogether. Dessner said Swift wrote the lyrics to his instrumental track in around five hours. Roisin O'Connor of The Independent compared the song to "Call It What You Want" from Swift's sixth studio album, Reputation (2017), while Spin Bobby Olivier compared it to "Wildest Dreams" from her fifth studio album, 1989 (2014).

Critical reception
Callie Ahlgrim of Insider Inc. dubbed the lyrics of "Cardigan" as an "effective way to evoke young love and innocence lost", describing them as simple, sharp and extremely poignant. Pitchfork's Jillian Mapes wrote that the song's "overlapping details and central framing device—of a cardigan forgotten and found without a second thought—are pure Swift". Courteney Larocca of Insider Inc. opined that the song has cues of Lana Del Rey. Laura Snapes of The Guardian described the song as "cavernous and shimmering as a rock pool in a cave". Jill Gutowitz of Vulture.com characterized "Cardigan" as "adorable, and yet, again, hurtful".

NME writer Hannah Mylrea defined the song as a "swirling amalgam" of gleaming production, swooning strings, flickering piano, and lyrics that exude pain from young love, and praised Swift's songwriting for "stunningly" conveying complex mixed emotions of hurt, jealousy and heartbreak in a "gorgeous" folk tune. Mylrea placed "Cardigan" at number four on her September 2020 list ranking all of Swift's 161 songs back then. Caragh Medlicott of Wales Arts Review deemed the song as "a resurgence of self-worth discovered, somewhat ironically, through the love of another". Uproxx's Philip Cosores stated that "Cardigan" is "rooted in the vivid details and melodic warmth that characterizes much of [Swift's] music". Entertainment Weekly's Maura Johnston felt the song's lyrics are "confident" but "slightly embittered", which he thought "pay off at the album's end". Billboard, on their list of 100 Best Songs of 2020, placed "Cardigan" at number 11, calling it "a lead single unlike anything Swift had released before." Emphasizing its "finest" storytelling, The Plain Dealer ranked the song number 6 on its list of best songs of 2020. Complex listed the song at number 21 on its ranking of best songs of 2020, highlighting Swift's evolved songwriting.

Commercial performance 
On Spotify, "Cardigan" debuted with over 7.742 million streams, garnering the biggest opening day for any song in 2020. It remained atop of the chart for four consecutive days, as of July 27, 2020. Following the inauguration of Billboard Global 200 chart seven weeks after the release of Folklore, "Cardigan" appeared at number 77 on the chart, dated September 19, 2020.

On the US Billboard Hot 100, "Cardigan" debuted at number one, earned Swift her sixth number-one single in the country and second number-one debut following "Shake It Off" (2014). This made Swift the first artist ever to debut at number-one on both the Hot 100 and Billboard 200 charts in the same week. The single was joined in the top-10 by fellow Folklore tracks "The 1" and "Exile", and increased Swift's number of top-10 songs to 28. Moreover, it extended her record as the woman with the most top-10 debuts to 18. In its opening week, "Cardigan" earned 34 million US streams, 12.7 million radio impressions and sold 71,000 digital downloads, debuting atop the Streaming Songs and Digital Song Sales charts dated August 8, 2020, further extending Swift's all-time record as the artist with the most number-ones on the Digital Song Sales chart to 20. In its second week on the Hot 100, "Cardigan" descended to number eight. Furthermore, the song also topped the Alternative Streaming Songs, Alternative Digital Song Sales, Hot Alternative Songs and Hot Rock & Alternative Songs charts.

In Australia, "Cardigan" debuted at number one on the ARIA Singles Chart, becoming Swift's sixth chart-topping single in the country, and her first chart-topping single since "Look What You Made Me Do" (2017). It was one of five songs that debuted in the top 10 in the country, making Folklore the album with the most top-10 songs of 2020 in the country. It also debuted at number two on New Zealand's Top 40 Singles chart, along with "The 1" and "Exile" in the top 10.

On the Canadian Hot 100, "Cardigan" peaked at number three, while in Ireland, the song debuted at number four on the Irish Singles Chart, accompanied by "Exile" and "The 1" in the top 10, bringing Swift's total Irish top-10 songs to 15. In the United Kingdom, the song entered at number six on the Official Singles Chart, opening with over 35,000 units. "Exile" and "The 1" also debuted in the top 10, taking Swift's total UK top-10s to sixteen, while making her the sixth woman in UK history to have three top-10 songs simultaneously.

"Cardigan" also charted in Austria (number 46), Belgium (2), Croatia (27), the Czech Republic (29), Denmark (19), Estonia (15), France (138), Germany (67), Hungary (29), Iceland (26), Japan (94), Lithuania (17), Malaysia (2), the Netherlands (1), Norway (27), Portugal (26), Scotland (16), Singapore (2), Slovakia (45), Spain (66), Sweden (31), and Switzerland (51).

Music video

Synopsis

An official music video for "Cardigan"—written, directed, and styled by Swift—was released alongside the album on July 24, 2020. The "homespun" and "dreamlike" video starts out with Swift sitting in a candlelit cottage in the woods, wearing a nightgown and playing a vintage upright piano. This scene also features a photograph of Swift's grandfather, Dean, who fought in the Battle of Guadalcanal, and a painting that she created during the first week of COVID-19 isolation. When the soundboard emanates golden sparkles, she climbs into it and finds herself magically transported to a moss-covered forest, where she plays the song on a grand piano producing a waterfall.

The piano bench begins to glow, Swift climbs into it again and is then carried to a dark, stormy, turbulent sea, where she holds on to a floating piano.  The piano soundboard glows and she climbs in, and she returns to the cottage, where she dons a cardigan. According to a video posted to her Vevo account, the forest scene "represents the evergreen beginning of a relationship where everything seems magical and full of beauty", while the ocean scene "represents the isolation and fear involved while a relationship is breaking down." The video also states the ending scene "signifies returning to a sense of self after experiencing love loss", a journey of self-discovery; Swift's soaking-wet nightgown signifies how the relationship changes the individual. The music video is characterized by a prairie, cottagecore aesthetic.

Production

The music video was inspired by the period and fantasy films that Swift watched in isolation during the COVID-19 lockdown. She contacted cinematographer Rodrigo Prieto in early July to work on the video; Prieto had previously worked on the music video for "The Man". As the director, Swift worked with assistant director Joe Osborne and set designer Ethan Tobman. Swift developed the concept for the video, which Prieto described as "more ambiguous", "more personal", and "more of a fantasy" than "The Man". Ahead of filming, Swift drafted a shot list of the video, detailing the video's scenes with specific time sequences in the song, and sent visual references to Prieto and Tobman to communicate her vision of the video.

The ongoing COVID-19 pandemic presented many challenges to filming, and extensive safety standards were enacted. All crew members underwent COVID-19 testing, wore masks at all times, and practiced social distancing as much as possible. An onsite medical inspector supervised COVID-19 health and safety guidelines. As Swift had to remain unmasked for large amounts of time while filming, crew members wore color-coded wristbands to denote those allowed to come within close contact with her. Additionally, the entire video was filmed from a camera mounted to a robotic arm controlled by a remote operator, a technique usually reserved for crane shots and establishing shots.

Aside from directing and acting, Swift also did her own makeup, hair, and styling for the video. To keep the song from being leaked, Swift wore an earpiece and lip-synced to the song. The video was filmed indoors over a day and-a-half. Swift and the video's editor, Chancler Haynes, "worked simultaneously from two separate locations on set in order to edit the video on time".

Fashion and aesthetic 
Accompanying the release of Folklore and "Cardigan", Swift sold "folklore cardigans", the replicas of the cardigan she wears in the song's music video—a cream-colored cable knit, with silver embroidered stars on the sleeves' chunky elbows, and navy blue piping and buttons—on her website. Swift also mailed the cardigans to celebrity friends and well-wishers. American fashion magazine W thought that the cardigan was the pièce de résistance of the album's cottagecore-centred merchandise. Teen Vogue said the cardigan aids in making "the perfect framework for understanding the role clothing plays in our lives", which gives a different perspective in understanding fashion, tracing back to fashion's "sentimental value". Refinery29 stated Swift returns to her "truest self", both musically and stylistically", bolstered by the merch cardigan and prairie dresses, and found the singer's looks in the music video similar to that of a classic "English rose". Irish Independent described the cardigan as a bulky, "Clancy Brothers-style" Aran sweater, and added that Swift "at this rate, [will] be playing a bodhrán and belting out 'The Auld Triangle' on Hill 16". Irish national broadcaster Raidió Teilifís Éireann thanked Swift for putting cardigans "back on the map once more", following James Thomas Brudenell, Coco Chanel, Kurt Cobain and Elizabeth II. The cottagecore aesthetic was met with resurgence on internet following the release of the video and the album.

Awards and nominations
"Cardigan" has received three awards and 14 nominations. The song won Favorite Music Video at the American Music Awards of 2020, and contended for Song of the Year and Best Pop Solo Performance at the 63rd Annual Grammy Awards, marking Swift's fifth song to be nominated for Song of the Year and the fourth in Best Pop Solo Performance.

Live performances and covers

Swift performed "Cardigan" in her 2020 concert documentary film, Folklore: The Long Pond Studio Sessions, alongside all of the other tracks on Folklore. She performed a shortened version of "Cardigan" at the 63rd Annual Grammy Awards, as part of a medley with "August" and "Willow" (2020), in a cottagecore setting featuring a moss-covered cabin inside a forest, accompanied by collaborators Dessner and Jack Antonoff. Pitchfork Cat Zhang named the performance as one of the show's best moments. She praised Swift's vocals and the enchanted forest theme of the staging, and dubbed Swift's look for the performance as a "benevolent fairy princess in a kingdom of dwarves". The Washington Post listed Swift's performance as the sixth best of the show, highlighting its Folklore-inspired special effects, such as "woodsy, mystical aesthetic" and "haunted-looking trees and glittering gold lights". Billboard critic Heran Mamo called it a "Lord of the Rings-meets-Twilight fantasy", and ranked it the fourth best performance of the evening. Rolling Stone Rob Sheffield ranked Swift's performance as the foremost reason "we loved the 2021 Grammys", and listed it as one of the top-five greatest Grammy performances of all time. The song was included on the set list of the Eras Tour (2023).

In October 2020, English singer-songwriter Yungblud covered "Cardigan" as part of his segment for BBC Radio 1's annual Live Lounge month. He mashed-up the song with Avril Lavigne's "I'm with You" (2002), accompanying himself on an acoustic guitar, joined by a cellist and two violinists, resulting in a cheerful, strings-laden performance. Swift responded to the medley affirmatively. In July 2021, Australian alternative rock band Something for Kate covered "Cardigan" as well, for a segment called Like a Version on Australian national radio station Triple J. The band stayed true to the song's original arrangement.

Track listing
 Digital download and streaming
 "Cardigan" – 4:00
 CD, 7" vinyl, 12" vinyl and picture disc
 "Cardigan" – 4:00
 "Songwriting Voice Memo" – 4:33
 CD, digital download, streaming, 7" vinyl and 12" vinyl (cabin in candlelight version)
 "Cardigan" (cabin in candlelight version) – 3:48
 "Cardigan" – 4:00

Credits and personnel

Song
Credits adapted from the liner notes of "Cardigan".

 Taylor Swift – vocals, songwriting
 Aaron Dessner – production, songwriting, record engineering, drum programming, bass, electric guitars, Mellotron, piano, percussion, synthesizers
 Jonathan Low – record engineering, mixing
 Laura Sisk – vocal engineering
 Bella Blasko – engineering
 Randy Merrill – mastering
 Bryce Dessner – orchestration
 Benjamin Lanz – modular synthesizer
 Dave Nelson – trombone
 James McAlister – drum programming
 Yuki Numata Resnick – violin, viola
 Kyle Resnick – engineering
 Clarice Jensen – cello

Music video
Credits adapted from YouTube.

 Taylor Swift – direction
 Jil Hardin – production
 Rebecca Skinner – executive production
 Rodrigo Prieto – photography direction
 Chancler Haynes – editing
 Ethan Tobman – production design
 Joe Osborne – 1st associate direction
 Grant Miller – visual effects
 David Lebensfeld – visual effects
 Josh Davis – gaffing
 Ryan Mcquire – key grip
 Vincent Lucido – storyboards

Charts

Weekly charts

Year-end charts

Certifications

Release history

See also
 List of Billboard Hot 100 number ones of 2020
 List of Billboard Hot 100 number-one singles of the 2020s
 List of Billboard Hot 100 top-ten singles in 2020
 List of Billboard Digital Song Sales number ones of 2020
 List of number-one singles of 2020 (Australia)
 List of top 10 singles in 2020 (Australia)
 List of top 10 singles in 2020 (Ireland)
 List of UK top-ten singles in 2020

Footnotes

References

2020s ballads
2020 singles
2020 songs
American indie rock songs
American folk songs
American soft rock songs
Billboard Hot 100 number-one singles
Music videos directed by Taylor Swift
Number-one singles in Australia
Republic Records singles
Rock ballads
Songs written by Taylor Swift
Songs written by Aaron Dessner
Song recordings produced by Aaron Dessner
Taylor Swift songs
Folk ballads
Impact of the COVID-19 pandemic on the music industry